Ľutina is a village and municipality in Sabinov District in the Prešov Region of north-eastern Slovakia.

Etymology
The name comes from Slavic ľutъ: wild, malicious (the name of the stream Ľutinka/Ľutina  that runs through the village).

History
In historical records the village was first mentioned in 1330.

Geography
The municipality lies at an altitude of 424 metres and covers an area of 6.906 km². It has a population of about 428 people.

References

External links
http://www.statistics.sk/mosmis/eng/run.html

Villages and municipalities in Sabinov District